Carlos Fernando Figueroa  (born 19 April 1980 in Guatemala) is a Guatemalan professional football midfielder currently plays for CSD Comunicaciones in Guatemala's top division.

He is also a member of the Guatemalan national team.

Club career
Figueroa began his career with CSD Municipal in 2001, and joined Olimpia of Paraguay from Xelajú for the Apertura 2009 tournament. He scored one goal on his debut against Club Libertad.

International career
Figueroa made his debut for Guatemala in a January 2003 friendly match against El Salvador and has made 37 appearances (scoring 3 goals), including three matches at the 2005 CONCACAF Gold Cup and four matches at the 2007 CONCACAF Gold Cup. He has also represented his country in 12 FIFA World Cup qualification matches.

His final international match so far was a November 2008 World Cup qualification match against the United States.

Career statistics

International goals
Scores and results list. Guatemala's goal tally first.

References

External links
 
 Player profile - CSD Municipal

1980 births
Living people
Sportspeople from Guatemala City
Guatemalan footballers
Guatemala international footballers
Guatemalan expatriate footballers
2003 UNCAF Nations Cup players
2005 UNCAF Nations Cup players
2005 CONCACAF Gold Cup players
2007 CONCACAF Gold Cup players
2011 Copa Centroamericana players
2011 CONCACAF Gold Cup players
2013 Copa Centroamericana players
2015 CONCACAF Gold Cup players
C.S.D. Municipal players
Xelajú MC players
Club Olimpia footballers
Expatriate footballers in Paraguay
Association football midfielders
Deportivo Petapa players